Moitessieria simoniana is a species of minute freshwater snail with an operculum, an aquatic gastropod molluscs or micromolluscs in the family Moitessieriidae. This species is found in France and Spain.

References

Moitessieriidae
Gastropods described in 1848
Taxonomy articles created by Polbot